Masrūq ibn Abraha was the Ethiopian ruler of Yemen under the Axumite Empire, as recorded in Arabic and Islamic traditions. He succeeded his father, Abraha. In 570, he was killed in the Battle of Hadhramaut in the Yemeni campaign of Wahriz, reportedly by an arrow shot by Wahriz himself. There are contradictory reports for the year of his death.

References
 
 C. E. Bosworth, “ABNĀʾ,” Encyclopædia Iranica, I/3, p. 226-228; an updated version is available online at http://www.iranicaonline.org/articles/abna-term (accessed on 25 January 2014).
 

Aksumite Empire
Abyssinian–Persian wars
Kings of Axum
Deaths by arrow wounds

570 deaths

Year of birth unknown
Year of death uncertain